Psammphiletria is a genus of loach catfishes found in the Congo River Basin.

Species 
There are currently two described species in this genus:
 Psammphiletria delicata T. R. Roberts, 2003
 Psammphiletria nasuta T. R. Roberts, 2003

References

Amphiliidae

Catfish genera
Taxa named by Tyson R. Roberts
Freshwater fish genera